Christiana Mariana von Ziegler (28 June 1695 – 1 May 1760) was a German poet and writer. She is best known for the texts of nine cantatas, which Johann Sebastian Bach composed after Easter of 1725.

Biography
Christiana Mariana Romanus was born in Leipzig, where her father served as mayor in 1701. She began her literary career after the death of her second husband, Captain von Ziegler in 1722. She returned to Leipzig, where she lived in the family home, the Romanushaus, with her mother.  Her father had received a long-term prison sentence for financial irregularities. Despite the difficult family circumstances, the house became a literary and musical salon. Johann Christoph Gottsched encouraged her poetic activity. She became the first woman member of Gottsched's literary society, the Deutsche Gesellschaft.

In 1741 she married for the third time and her literary activity ceased.

She died in Frankfurt an der Oder.

Libretti

Bach moved to Leipzig in 1723 to take up the post of Thomaskantor.  In this role he set about composing a large number of cantatas for performance in the city's churches. There is some uncertainty about who was writing Bach's libretti in his first couple of years in Leipzig.  
Whoever his original librettist was, Bach appears to have been looking for a new librettist in 1724, and this may be when he met Ziegler.
The nine cantatas set by Bach to texts by Ziegler are:

 Ihr werdet weinen und heulen, BWV 103, 22 April 1725
 Es ist euch gut, daß ich hingehe, BWV 108, 29 April 1725
 Bisher habt ihr nichts gebeten in meinem Namen, BWV 87, 6 May 1725
 Auf Christi Himmelfahrt allein, BWV 128, 10 May 1725
 Sie werden euch in den Bann tun, BWV 183, 13 May 1725
 Wer mich liebet, der wird mein Wort halten, BWV 74, 20 May 1725
 Also hat Gott die Welt geliebt, BWV 68, 21 May 1725
 Er rufet seinen Schafen mit Namen, BWV 175, 22 May 1725
 Es ist ein trotzig und verzagt Ding, BWV 176, 27 May 1725

The question arises why Bach turned to other librettists. There were still texts by Ziegler unset. She published a cycle of cantata texts in 1728, the texts set by Bach and others not set by him.
John Eliot Gardiner suggests that the relationship between the two may have been strained by Bach's habit of amending her texts to suit his purposes.  There also seem to be some examples of lack of communication when Bach sets Ziegler's words by adapting music he had composed earlier (as for example in Er rufet seinen Schafen mit Namen, BWV 175).

Bibliography
 Vermischte Schriften in gebundener und ungebunder Rede [Miscellaneous writings in verse and prose] (1739)

References

Further reading
 Bloomsbury Guide to Women's Literature
 Katherine R. Goodman, Amazons and Apprentices. Women and the German Parnassus in the Early Enlightenment. Rochester, NY: Camden House, 1999. .
 Katherine R. Goodman, "From Salon to Kaffeekranz. Gender Wars and the Coffee Cantata in Bach's Leipzig", in Bach's Changing World. Voices in the Community. Ed. Carol Baron. Rochester, N. Y.: University of Rochester Press, 2006. pp. 190–218.  
 Katherine R. Goodman, "'Ich bin die deutsche Redlichkeit.' Christiane Mariane von Ziegler's letters to Johann Ernst Philippi," Daphnis 29/1-2 (2000), pp. 307=354.
 Mark A. Peters, A Woman's Voice in Baroque Music. Mariane von Ziegler and J.S. Bach. London: Routlegde, 2017 .

External links
 
Werke von Christiana Mariana von Ziegler Zeno.org 
 
Biografie, Literatur & Quellen zu Christiane Marianne von Ziegler fembio.org 
Frauen und Universität im Jahrhundert der Aufklärung University of Leipzig

1695 births
1760 deaths
Writers from Leipzig
People from the Electorate of Saxony
German women poets
German cantata librettists
German salon-holders
Women librettists
18th-century German women writers